Francesco Marianini (born 6 May 1979) is an Italian association football midfielder.

Marianini started his career at Lucchese. In summer 2003, he joined Triestina of Serie B in co-ownership deal, but bought back in June 2004 and sold to Serie A side Lecce. After Lecce relegated, he joined Empoli of Serie A and followed the team relegated to Serie B in 2008.

In June 2010, he left for Serie B newcomer Novara on a three-year contract. On 18 July 2012 he added one more year (to 2014) to his current contract.

References

External links
 Profile at AIC.Football.it 
 

1979 births
S.S.D. Lucchese 1905 players
Association football midfielders
Empoli F.C. players
Italian footballers
Living people
Novara F.C. players
Sportspeople from Pisa
Serie A players
Serie B players
U.S. Lecce players
U.S. Triestina Calcio 1918 players
Footballers from Tuscany